Dayaldas Baghel is politician from Bharatiya Janata Party.

Since 2013 he is representing Nawagarh in Chhattisgarh Vidhan Sabha. He resides at Village & Post of Kunvara in Tehsil Nawagarh of District Bemetara. He was the minister of Cooperation, Culture and Tourism of Chhattisgarh.

References

Living people
People from Bemetara district
Chhattisgarh MLAs 2013–2018
Bharatiya Janata Party politicians from Chhattisgarh
Year of birth missing (living people)